Semicossyphus is a genus of wrasses native to the Pacific Ocean.

Species
The currently recognized species in this genus are:
 Semicossyphus darwini (Jenyns, 1842) (Galápagos sheephead, goldspot sheepshead)
 Semicossyphus pulcher (Ayres, 1854) (California sheephead)
 Semicossyphus reticulatus (Valenciennes, 1839) (Asian sheepshead wrasse)

References

 
Labridae
Marine fish genera
Taxa named by Albert Günther
Taxonomy articles created by Polbot